MeerKAT, originally the Karoo Array Telescope, is a radio telescope consisting of 64 antennas in the Meerkat National Park, in the Northern Cape of South Africa. In 2003, South Africa submitted an expression of interest to host the Square Kilometre Array (SKA) Radio Telescope in Africa, and the locally designed and built MeerKAT was incorporated into the first phase of the SKA. MeerKAT was launched in 2018.

Along with the Hydrogen Epoch of Reionization Array (HERA), also in South Africa, and two radio telescopes in Western Australia, the Australian SKA Pathfinder (ASKAP) and the Murchison Widefield Array (MWA), the MeerKAT is one of four precursors to the final SKA.

History

MeerKAT is a precursor for the SKA-mid array, as are the Hydrogen Epoch of Reionization Array (HERA), the Australian SKA Pathfinder (ASKAP) and the Murchison Widefield Array (MWA).

Description
It is located on the SKA site in the Karoo, and is a pathfinder for SKA-mid technologies and science. It was designed by engineers within the South Africa Radio Astronomy Observatory and South African industries, and most of the hardware and software was sourced in South Africa. It comprises 64 antennas, each 13.5m in diameter, equipped with cryogenic receivers. The antennas have positions for four receivers, and one of the three vacant positions will be filled by S-band receivers provided by the Max Planck Institute for Radio Astronomy (MPIfR). The array configuration has 61% of the antennas located within a 1 km diameter circle, and the remaining 39% distributed out to a radius of 4 km.

The receiver outputs are digitised immediately at the antenna, and the digital data streams are transported to the Karoo Array Processor Building (KAPB) via buried optical fibres.  The antenna signals are processed by the Correlator/Beamformer (CBF) digital signal processor. Data from the CBF is passed on to the Science Processor computer cluster and disk storage modules. The MeerKAT antenna data is also made available to a number of user-supplied digital backends via the CBF, including pulsar and fast radio burst (FRB) search engines, a precision pulsar timing system, and a SETI signal processor. A time and frequency reference (TFR) system provides clock and absolute time signals required by the digitisers and other telescope subsystems.  This TFR system comprises two hydrogen maser clocks, two rubidium atomic clocks, a precise crystal oscillator, and a set of GNSS receiver systems for time transfer with UTC.

The massive computing and digital signal-processing systems located at the KAPB are housed in a large shielded chamber (or Faraday cage) to prevent radio signals from the equipment interfering with the sensitive radio receivers. The KAPB itself is partially buried below ground level to provide additional radio frequency interference (RFI) protection, and to provide temperature stability. The KAPB also houses a power conditioning facility for the entire site, including three diesel rotary UPS units that provide an uninterrupted power supply to the whole site.

A long-haul optical fibre transfers data from the KAPB to the Centre for High Performance Computing (CHPC) and SARAO office in Cape Town, and provides a control and monitoring link to the SARAO operations centre in Cape Town. Telescope data processing and reduction is executed on compute facilities provided by the MeerKAT SP systems, and on other high performance computer facilities provides by MeerKAT users.

Specifications 
MeerKAT inaugurated in July 2018 consists of 64 dishes of 13.5 metres in diameter each with an offset Gregorian configuration. An offset dish configuration has been chosen because its unblocked aperture provides uncompromised optical performance and sensitivity, excellent imaging quality and good rejection of unwanted radio frequency interference from satellites and terrestrial transmitters. It also facilitates the installation of multiple receiver systems in the primary and secondary focal areas and is the reference design for the mid-band SKA concept.

MeerKAT supports a wide range of observing modes, including deep continuum, polarisation and spectral line imaging, pulsar timing and transient searches. A range of standard data products are provided, including an imaging pipeline. A number of "data spigots" are also available to support user-provided instrumentation. Significant design and qualification efforts are planned to ensure high reliability to achieve low operational cost and high availability.

MeerKAT's 64 dishes are distributed over two components:
 A dense inner component containing 70% of the dishes. These are distributed in a two-dimensional fashion with a Gaussian distribution with a mean dispersion of 300 m, a shortest baseline of 29 m and a longest baseline of 1 km.
 An outer component containing 30% of the dishes. These are also distributed in a two-dimensional Gaussian distribution with a mean dispersion of 2,500 m and a longest baseline of 8 km.

Construction schedule

To acquire experience in the construction of interferometric telescopes, members of the Karoo Array Telescope constructed the Phased Experimental Demonstrator (PED) at the South African Astronomical Observatory in Cape Town between 2005 and 2007.

During 2007, the  eXperimental Development Model Telescope (XDM) was built at the Hartebeesthoek Radio Astronomy Observatory to serve as a testbed for MeerKAT.

Construction of the MeerKAT Precursor Array (MPA – also known as KAT-7), on the site started in August 2009. In April 2010 four of the seven first dishes were linked together as an integrated system to produce its first interferometric image of an astronomical object. In Dec 2010, there was a successful detection of very long baseline interferometry (VLBI) fringes between the Hartebeesthoek Radio Astronomy Observatory 26 m dish and one of the KAT-7 dishes.

Despite original plans to complete MeerKAT by 2012, construction was suspended in late 2010 due to budget restructure. Science Minister Naledi Pandor denied the suspension marked any setback to the SKA project or 'external considerations'. MeerKAT construction received no funding in 2010/11 and 2011/12. The 2012 South African National Budget projected that just 15 MeerKAT antennas would be completed by 2015.

The last of the reinforced concrete foundations for the MeerKAT antennas was completed on 11 February 2014. Almost 5000 m3 of concrete and over 570 tonnes of steel were used to build the 64 bases over a 9-month period.

MeerKAT is planned to be completed in three phases. The first phase will include all the antennas but only the first receiver will be fitted. A processing bandwidth of 750 MHz is available. For the second and third phases, the remaining two receivers will be fitted and the processing bandwidth will be increased to at least 2 GHz, with a goal of 4 GHz. With construction of all sixty-four MeerKAT antennas complete, verification tests have begun to ensure the instruments are functioning correctly. Following this, MeerKAT will be commissioned in the second half of 2018 with the array then coming online for science operations.

Inauguration 
On 13 July 2018, the Deputy President of South Africa, David Mabuza, inaugurated the MeerKAT Telescope, and unveiled an image produced by MeerKAT that revealed unprecedented detail of the region surrounding the supermassive black hole at the centre of our Milky Way Galaxy.

The 64 MeerKAT antennas will be incorporated into Phase 1 of the SKA Mid Frequency Array once the 133 SKA dishes have been built and commissioned on the Karoo site, resulting in a total of 197 antennas for the SKA array. All of the infrastructure currently associated with MeerKAT will be transferred to the SKA array. The KAPB has the capacity to house the additional equipment required by SKA Mid.

Science objectives
The science objectives of the MeerKAT surveys are in line with the prime science drivers for the first phase of the SKA, confirming MeerKAT's designation as an SKA precursor instrument. Five years of observing time on MeerKAT have been allocated to leading astronomers who have applied for time to do research.

Site 
The South African Department of Science and Technology, through the NRF and SARAO, has invested more than R760 million in infrastructure on the South African SKA site. The innovative design and engineering of the infrastructure established for MeerKAT, as well as the RFI-quiet environment, favourable physical site characteristics, and on-site technical expertise has positioned the site in the Karoo as an ideal location for other radio astronomy experiments.

The HERA (Hydrogen Epoch of Reionisation Array) radio telescope is one such instrument co-located at the South African SKA site. HERA is designed to detect, for the first time, radio signals from the very first stars and galaxies that formed early in the life of the universe. South African engineers and scientists are working with their colleagues at the University of California Berkeley in the US, and Cambridge University in the UK, to build HERA and exploit its unique and fundamental scientific capabilities.

Other experiments which have been constructed at the SA SKA site include PAPER (the Precision Array to Probe the Epoch of Ionisation) and the C-BASS (the C-Band All Sky Survey).

To ensure long term viability of the Karoo site for the MeerKAT and the SKA, and for other radio astronomy instruments, the South African Parliament passed the Astronomy Geographic Advantage Act, in 2007. The act gives the Minister of Science and Technology the authority to protect areas, through regulations, that are of strategic national importance for astronomy and related scientific endeavours.

Discoveries 
In September 2019,  an international team of astronomers using South Africa’s MeerKAT radio telescope discovered enormous balloon-like structures that tower hundreds of light-years above and below the centre of our galaxy.

South Africa and SKA science and technology 
The experience gained by South African engineers in the design and construction of MeerKAT had been carried over to the SKA design, reducing risks and development costs.  South African engineers within SARAO and South African industrial partners have participated in 7 of the 11 SKA engineering design consortia, contributing about 10% of the workforce in these internationally distributed consortia. The Infrastructure South Africa Consortium and the Assembly, Integration, Verification (AIV) Consortium have been led by SARAO, and there was South African participation in the DISH Consortium, Science Data Processor (SDP) Consortium, the Signal and Data Transport (SaDT Consortium), the Telescope Manager (TM) Consortium and the Mid-frequency Aperture Array Consortium.  South African engineers have overseen the system engineering aspects of 5 of the consortia.  SARAO has signed an MoU with the SKAO to provide resources to the Bridging Activities that will continue the development of SKA subsystems now that the consortia have concluded their work.  Participation by South African industrial partners in previous consortium work and future Bridging Activities is facilitated by SARAO through the Financial Assistance Programme (FAP) funding initiative.

Scientists from SARAO and South African universities are well represented on the various SKA Science Working Groups (SWGs), with about 10% of the authors of papers in the SKA Science Book having South African institution affiliations. The MeerKAT Large Science Projects (LSPs) are closely aligned with the SKA science case, and there is a large membership overlap between the LSP teams and the associated SWGs.

Capacity development for radio astronomy in Africa  
To create the required skills to design, construct and operate the SKA and MeerKAT telescopes, and to make optimal use of these radio telescopes for research, once commissioned, SARAO initiated a capacity development programme, in 2005. The programme is fully integrated into the operations of SARAO, and it is crafted to develop and retain the excellent researchers, engineers and artisans required to ensure that the MeerKAT and SKA will be successful in South Africa. To date the programme has provided more than 1000 scholarships and fellowships across all relevant academic levels, and for a range of relevant qualifications. The programme is coveted by academic colleagues from abroad because of its success in developing, from a low base, significant expertise in radio astronomy over the past 14 years.

African Very Long Baseline Interferometry Network (AVN) 
The African Very Long Baseline Interferometry (VLBI) Network (AVN) is an important development towards building SKA on the African Continent. The AVN programme will transfer skills and knowledge in the SKA African partner countries (Botswana, Ghana, Kenya, Madagascar, Mauritius, Mozambique, Namibia, and Zambia) to build, maintain, operate and use radio telescopes.

MeerKAT will also participate in global VLBI operations with all major radio astronomy observatories around the world and will add considerably to the sensitivity of the global VLBI network. Further potential science objectives for MeerKAT are to participate in the search for extraterrestrial intelligence and collaborate with NASA on downloading information from space probes.

See also 
 Australian Square Kilometre Array Pathfinder
 Hartebeesthoek Radio Astronomy Observatory
 Karoo
 List of radio telescopes
 Precision Array for Probing the Epoch of Reionization
 South African Astronomical Observatory for optical astronomy in South Africa
 Square Kilometer Array

References

External links 

 SKA South Africa
 eXperimental Development Model (XDM) at Hartebeeshoek
 YouTube: Square Kilometre Array

Astronomical observatories in South Africa
Buildings and structures in the Northern Cape
Karoo
Radio telescopes
Astronomy protected areas of South Africa
Square Kilometre Array
Telescopes under construction
Interferometric telescopes